Miller Hall may refer to:

Miller Hall (Chadron, Nebraska), listed on the National Register of Historic Places in Dawes County, Nebraska
Miller Hall (Waynesburg University), Greene County, Pennsylvania

Architectural disambiguation pages